KVRO (101.1 FM) is a radio station broadcasting a classic hits music format. Licensed to Stillwater, Oklahoma, United States. The station is currently owned by Stillwater Broadcasting, LLC.

References

External links

Classic hits radio stations in the United States
VRO